Aar Paar is a 1985 Indian Hindi-language action film directed by Shakti Samanta, based on the story of Shaktipada Rajguru. It stars Rozina, Mithun Chakraborty, Utpal Dutt in lead roles.

Soundtrack 
Lyrics: Anand Bakshi

"Jaiyo Na Jaiyo Na Door Humre Jiya Me Rahiyo" – Sabina Yasmin, Kishore Kumar
"Gali Gali Shor Hai, Sethiya Chor" – Kishore Kumar
"Kaunse Dariya, Kaunse Nadiya Ka Tu Rehane Waala" – Sabina Yasmin
"O Maajhi Teri Naiyaan Se Chhuta Kinaara" – R D Burman
"Mera Naam Pannabai Patnewali" – Shailendra Singh, Asha Bhosle
"Kaunse Dariya, Kaunse Nadiya Ki Tu Rehane Waali" – Kishore Kumar

Cast 

 Rozina as Kamli
 Nuton as Pannabai
 Mithun Chakraborty as Ghansham alias Ghaniya
 Utpal Dutt as Mahesh Babu
 Tarun Ghosh as Padla
 Hasan Imam
 Deepa Sahi 
 Asit Sen 
 Manik Dutt as Jatin
 Maya Ghosh 
 A.T.M. Shamsuzzaman (Bangladesh)
 Golam Mustafa (Bangladesh) 
 Madhu
 Ahmed Shariff 
 Ghulam Rafique

References

External links 
 

1985 films
1980s Hindi-language films
Indian action films
Films directed by Shakti Samanta
Films scored by R. D. Burman
1985 action films
Hindi-language action films
Films based on works by Shaktipada Rajguru